SuanShu is a Java math library. It is open-source under Apache License 2.0 available in GitHub. SuanShu is a large collection of Java classes for basic numerical analysis, statistics, and optimization. It implements a parallel version of the adaptive strassen's algorithm for fast matrix multiplication. SuanShu has been quoted and used in a number of academic works.

Features 

 linear algebra
 root finding
 curve fitting and interpolation
 unconstrained and constrained optimization
 statistical analysis
 linear regression
 probability distributions and random number generation
 ordinary and partial differential equation solvers

License terms 
SuanShu is released under the terms of the Apache License 2.0

Examples of usage 
The following code shows the object-oriented design of the library (in contrast to the traditional procedural design of many other FORTRAN and C numerical libraries) by a simple example of minimization.

LogGamma logGamma = new LogGamma(); // the log-gamma function
BracketSearchMinimizer solver = new BrentMinimizer(1e-8, 10); // precision, max number of iterations
UnivariateMinimizer.Solution soln = solver.solve(logGamma); // optimization
double x_min = soln.search(0, 5); // bracket = [0, 5]
System.out.println(String.format("f(%f) = %f", x_min, logGamma.evaluate(x_min)));

See also 

 SOCP - Explanation of Second Order Conic Programming
 SDP - Explanation of Semidefinite Programming
 SQP - Explanation of Sequential quadratic programming
 Interior Point Method
 Adaptive strassen's algorithm  – fast matrix multiplication
 Apache License 2.0 - Version 2 of the Apache Software License

References 

Numerical libraries
Java (programming language) libraries
Public-domain software with source code
Numerical software